The coat of arms of Burnaby was granted originally to the Corporation of the District of Burnaby by the Canadian Heraldic Authority in 1991, and then reconfirmed for the City of Burnaby in 2005 as the Corporation's successor. The grant included the full coat of arms as well as a flag and a badge, both derived from the arms.

History
Incl previous versions

Blazon
Descriptive; full blazon in infobox

Crest
Issuant from a mural coronet Argent masoned Gules charged with fraises in fess Gules a demi lion Gules armed and langued Azure bearing between the forepaws a staff Or flying a banner of the Arms
 
Shield
Azure on a Canadian fess wavy Or an eagle displayed Azure armed and tufted Argent charged on each wing with a fountain

Supporters
On a grassy compartment Vert dexter a stag Or gorged with a collar of rhododendron flowers Gules sinister a doe Or with a like collar

Motto
BY RIVER AND SEA RISE BURNABY

See also
Canadian heraldry
National symbols of Canada
List of Canadian provincial and territorial symbols
Heraldry

References

External links
City of Burnaby: Coat of Arms

Burnaby
Burnaby
Burnaby
Burnaby
Burnaby
Burnaby